Mykhailo Kuzmych Rodionov (10 July 1937 – 15 September 2022) was a Ukrainian politician. A member of the Communist Party of Ukraine, he served in the Verkhovna Rada from 2002 to 2006.

Rodionov died in Kyiv on 15 September 2022, at the age of 85.

References

1937 births
2022 deaths
Communist Party of Ukraine politicians
Communist Party of the Soviet Union members
Third convocation members of the Verkhovna Rada
Fourth convocation members of the Verkhovna Rada
Recipients of the Order of the Red Banner of Labour
Recipients of the Order of Friendship of Peoples
People from Kursk Oblast